Arrowsmith Bank is a submerged bank in Mexico. It is located in the Caribbean Sea off the northeastern end of the Yucatán Peninsula.

Geography
The bank is an underwater area that is wholly submerged. Its depths range between 25 and 400 m.

References

External links
Fishing at Arrowsmith Bank Mexico

Undersea banks of the Caribbean Sea
Reefs of Mexico